Sigurd Eystein Køhn (6 August 1959 – 26 December 2004) was a Norwegian jazz saxophonist and composer.

Career 
Køhn was born in Kristiansand, Norway, and started playing the violin and the clarinet at the age of 9, and begun playing the alto saxophone when he was 14.

He moved to Oslo when he was 19 years old, and became quickly a part of the city's jazz life. In the 1980s, he played the saxophone with different fusion and soul bands ("Lava", "Son of Sam", "The Heavy Gentlemen" and more), but he returned to the jazz in the 1990s. He played with the jazz quartet The Real Thing from 1992 until his death, in addition to his own "Sigurd Køhn Quartet" from 1994 and "Køhn/Johansen Sextet" from 1999. In 1996, Køhn's first record under his own name was released, More Pepper, Please. On the album, Køhn performed the music of Art Pepper, in cooperation with, among others, Dag Arnesen and Jarle Vespestad. The album was well received.

He performed with the band a-ha on their tours between 1991–1994, and he also recorded a jazz cover of their song "October".

He had just finished his last album, This Place, before the tsunami disaster, which was due to be released in January 2005 along with a release concert planned for January 17. Because of the tragic events, the release of his record was delayed, but the concert became a tribute concert to Køhn's music, where many of his friends participated. The record was released by his widow Heidi Køhn on 26 October 2005.

Death 
Sigurd Køhn and his 16-year-old son Simen drowned after being struck by the tsunami during their vacation in Khao Lak, Thailand, on 26 December 2004.

Discography (in selection)

Solo albums 
1996: More Pepper, Please (Real Records)
2005: This Place (Real Records), as S.K. Quartet

Collaborative works 
Within The Real Thing
1992: The Real Thing (Real Records)
1992: In New York (Real Records)
1994: A Perfect Match (Real Records), with Bohuslän Big Band
1995: Live (Real Records)
1995: Pleasure Is An Attitude (Real Records)
2000: Deluxe (Real Records)
2003: New Wrapping (Real Records)

Within "Køhn/Johansen Sextet"
1999: Woman's Got To Have It (Real Records)
2003: Angels (Real Records)

References

External links 

1959 births
2004 deaths
Deaths by drowning
Victims of the 2004 Indian Ocean earthquake and tsunami
20th-century Norwegian saxophonists
21st-century Norwegian saxophonists
Norwegian jazz saxophonists
Norwegian jazz composers
Male jazz composers
Musicians from Kristiansand
Natural disaster deaths in Thailand
20th-century saxophonists
20th-century Norwegian male musicians
21st-century Norwegian male musicians
Lava (band) members
The Real Thing (Norwegian band) members
20th-century jazz composers